Dragon Lore: The Legend Begins is a point-and-click adventure game released in 1994 by Cryo Interactive for MS-DOS, and later ported to the 3DO video game console. The game was a commercial success, with sales of 300,000 units by 1997. An emulated version was released for Microsoft Windows and macOS in 2013.

Gameplay 
Dragon Lore is a point and click adventure game seen from the first person perspective, with static backgrounds and a few animated objects. The inventory system and general atmosphere of the whole game feels very much like an RPG, despite the fact that character progression of any kind is almost non-existent. Fighting with enemies depends largely on equipment found and some enemies are not defeated in face to face confrontation, but by solving puzzles.

Plot
The player character is Werner Von Wallenrod, a farm boy who must interact with various characters in a fantasy atmosphere, solve puzzles, and fight enemies. Eventually the protagonist uncovers that he is the orphaned son of the late Axel von Wallenrod, a "Dragon Knight." Werner sets out to uncover his past and reclaim his heritage. Werner's ultimate goal is to earn the favor of enough of the current Dragon Knights so as to be voted into their order. He also has to deal with his rival, Haggen Von Diakkonov.

Release 
The game was bundled with multimedia kits such as the Reveal kit that featured a SC400 sound card, speakers, and a large bundle of multimedia software, including games and educational titles. Besides Dragon Lore, this kit featured another Cryo Interactive game, MegaRace. At the time, many personal computers were not equipped with CD-ROMs and sound cards out of the box, and users wanting these features may have chosen their kit based on the pack-in software.

In Spain, it was originally marketed in an edition with Spanish texts and English voices. In 1996 it was re-released by Planeta DeAgostini as part of the Juegos CD-ROM collection together with Cyclemania, in a new Spanish dubbed edition.

GOG.com released an emulated version for Microsoft Windows and Mac OS X in 2013.

Technical issues 
The PC version had relatively high memory requirements, which made the game difficult to run unless the user first edited the AUTOEXEC.BAT and CONFIG.SYS files and/or created a boot disk.

Reception

Dragon Lore was a commercial success, with sales of 300,000 units by 1997.

A reviewer for Next Generation applauded the game for its fast-moving rendered graphics, captivating plot, and gratifyingly difficult puzzles in its later sections. He added that the inclusion of fighting segments, in addition to being satisfying of themselves, serve to break up the monotony that puzzle adventure games sometimes suffer from.

Computer Gaming World praised the game for its "tremendous graphics" and "meaningful game options" but criticized how the game world appeared "too empty and non-interactive"

GamePros brief review of the 3DO version stated, "Smooth, rendered 3D animation and voice clips accompany the great mythological storyline to make up a well-rounded game. RPG fans will enjoy the attention to detail as well as the intuitive motions and menus ... slow access time is one of the few setbacks."

Legacy 
Cryo Interactive released a sequel named Dragon Lore II: The Heart of the Dragon in 1996.

See also 

 List of Cryo Interactive video games

References

External links
Dragon Lore at Giant Bomb

Dragon Lore at IGDB.com

1994 video games
3DO Interactive Multiplayer games
Adventure games
Cancelled Sega CD games
Cryo Interactive games
DOS games
Fantasy video games
Games commercially released with DOSBox
Single-player video games
Video games developed in France
Video games scored by Stéphane Picq
Video games with pre-rendered 3D graphics
Mindscape games